Samuel Indratma (born December 22, 1970) in Central Java, Indonesia, is a community visual artist and muralist, who studied graphic art between 1990 and 1996 at the faculty of Fine Art, Indonesian Institute of the Arts, Yogyakarta, Indonesia.

He was a prominent member of the left wing, activist group of artists, Apotik Komik, operating between 1997 and 2005, creating public art in Yogyakarta, Indonesia. The group considered their public art as a tool of social communication.  Indratma also co-founded the Jogjakarta Mural Forum, which formed in 2005.

Solo exhibitions

 Mural Blues (Yogyakarta, 1997)
 From Horror to Hope (Yogyakarta, 1998)
 Begadang III (Yogyakarta, 2001)
 The Interpretation of Sureq La Galigo (Singapore, 2004)
 Urban Apartment (Melbourne, 2007-2008)
 Agro Metal (Jogjakarta, 2009)

Group exhibitions
 AWAS! Recent Art from Indonesia (Traveling exhibition, which visited Indonesia, Australia, Japan, and Europe (1999-2001))
 Four Member of Apotik Komik (Singapore, 2000)
 36 Ideas from Asia: Contemporary South-east Asian Art (Traveling exhibition, which visited Singapore and Europe (2002-2003))
 Melbourne connection Asia (Melbourne, 2003)
 Exploring Vacuum II (Jogjakarta, 2003)
 CP Open Biennale 2003 (Jakarta, 2003)
 15 Tracks: Contemporary Southeast Asian Art (Traveling exhibition, which visited Japan (2003-2004))
 Reformasi (Singapore, 2004)
 Olympics Art Exhibition (Jakarta, 2004) 
 Contemporary Heroes (Yogyakarta, 2008) 
 The Highlight (Yogyakarta, 2008)

Art Projects 
 Melayang (Exhibition of comic murals, Yogyakarta, 1997)
 Sakit Berlanjut (Public art project with venues in various public spaces of Yogyakarta, 1999)
 Les Paravent (Stage artistic for Theater Garasi, Jakarta, 2000)
 Galeri Publik Apotik Komic (Founding of a public street gallery for the duration of one year, involving input from six young artists from Jakarta and Jogjakarta, 2000-2001)
 Sama-sama City Mural Project (Various public spaces of Jogjakarta, 2002)
 Sama-sama / You're Welcome (Indonesian - American Art collaboration between Apotik Komik and the Clarion Alley Mural Project, San Francisco, various public spaces of Jogjakarta).
 Intersection (San Francisco, 2003) 
 Gesalt (Gestalt: (n)a configuration or pattern of elements so unified as a whole that it cannot be described merely as a sum of its parts. , 2003) 
 Art & Peace Project (Collaboration with Haverford college students, Pennsylvania, 2003)
 Tanda Mata Mural Art Projects (Workshop mural for 6 slum area in Jogjakarta, including at Fly Over Lempuyangan, 2007–2008)
 Kode Post Sign Art Projects (Workshop Sign Art for 12 kampong in Jogjakarta, 2008)
 School Art Project (Workshop involving high school students to make sculpture for public spaces, 2008)

Residencies 
 2003 : Clarion Alley Mural, San Francisco for 2 months. 
 2007 : ArtPlay Melbourne and Tasmania for 2 months.

References

External links 
 Agor Metal Review Tembi Contemporary Gallery Site (English)
 Tempo Interaktif Article (Indonesian)
 Suara Karya Article (Indonesian)

Living people
Indonesian Christians
People from Central Java
Indonesian artists
1970 births